Wellness may refer to:

 Health
 Well-being, psychological wellness
 Wellness (alternative medicine)
 Workplace wellness
 Wellness tourism
 Eudaimonia, wellness in ancient philosophy

Other uses
 Wellness (pet food), a brand of dog and cat food used by the company WellPet
 Wellness (album), the 2015 studio album by band Last Dinosaurs
For wellness center see:
 Health club
 Sauna

See also
 Well (disambiguation)